The Toyota Music Factory (originally known as Irving Music Factory) is an entertainment complex located in the Las Colinas neighborhood of Irving, Texas.

Developed by the ARK Group, City of Irving and designed by architecture firm Gensler, for roughly $US175 million, the live music venue holds more than 8,000 spectators. The development is slated to include 300,000 square feet of retail and restaurants, 100,000 square feet concert hall and amphitheater with 8,000 capacity, an outdoor event plaza and 100,000 square feet of office.

History 
In 2007, voters in Irving agreed to finance an entertainment center near Texas State Highway 114.
In 2014, The ARK Group announced that a new entertainment district near the Irving Convention Center was planned for Irving, Texas.

The venue was originally scheduled to open as the "Irving Music Factory" on September 1, 2017, with a live performance by comedian Dave Chappelle. However, construction delays caused the September 1 opening to be cancelled. On September 8, The ARK Group announced that venue was being renamed the Toyota Music Factory and would open the following day with a ZZ Top concert as its inaugural event. The venue formally opened on September 9.

Layout 
Alongside these facilities lies a 4,000-seat indoor music theatre, "The Pavilion at the Toyota Music Factory" whose wall can retract to create an open-air pavilion capable of seating an additional 4,000 people on its  lawn.

Developers 
The ARK Group
The ARK Group, owned by Noah Lazes and Richard Lazes, is a developer who focuses on mixed-use developments and entertainment zones. Previous projects include the original Music Factory in Charlotte, North Carolina and Level Entertainment Venue in Miami, Florida.

Gensler
Gensler is a global design firm with 44 offices and over 5,000 architects, interior architects, planners and designers. Previous projects include sports/entertainment district L.A. Live and MGM CityCenter. Gensler Dallas, who designed Irving's Music Factory, has a portfolio of mixed-use developments including Legacy West and The Star in Frisco.

External links
The Pavilion at Toyota Music Factory
Toyota Music Factory

References 

Music venues in Dallas
Theatre in Dallas
Concert halls in Dallas
Amphitheaters in Texas
Entertainment venues in Texas
Concert halls in Texas
Theatres in Texas
Music venues in Texas
Amphitheaters in the United States
Buildings and structures completed in 2017
2017 establishments in Texas
Music venues completed in 2017
Buildings and structures in Irving, Texas
Esports venues in Texas
Dallas Fuel